Frank Curran (31 May 1917 – 24 September 1998) was an English footballer, who played as an inside forward in the Football League for Southport, Accrington Stanley, Bristol Rovers and Tranmere Rovers.

References

External links

Tranmere Rovers F.C. players
Shrewsbury Town F.C. players
Bristol Rovers F.C. players
Association football inside forwards
English Football League players
Accrington Stanley F.C. (1891) players
Bristol City F.C. players
1998 deaths
Southport F.C. players
1917 births
English footballers